The Sanzhi UFO Houses, also known as the UFO houses of Sanjhih, Sanjhih pod houses or Sanjhih Pod City, were a set of abandoned and never completed pod-shaped buildings in Sanzhi District, New Taipei, Taiwan. The buildings resembled Futuro houses, some examples of which can be found elsewhere in Taiwan. The site where the buildings were located was owned by Hung Kuo Group.

Construction and abandonment 
The UFO houses were constructed beginning in 1978. They were intended as a vacation resort in a part of the northern coast adjacent to Tamsui, and were marketed towards U.S. military officers coming from their East Asian postings. However, the project was abandoned in 1980 due to investment losses and several car accident deaths and suicides during construction, which is said to have been caused by the inauspicious act of bisecting the Chinese dragon sculpture located near the resort gates for widening the road to the buildings. Other stories indicated that the site was the former burial ground for Dutch soldiers.

The pod-like buildings became a minor tourist attraction due in part to their unusual architecture. The structures have since been the subject of a film, used as a location by MTV for cinematography, photographed by people, and become a subject in online discussions, described as a ghost town or "ruins of the future".

Demolition
The buildings were scheduled to be torn down in late 2008, despite an online petition to retain one of the structures as a museum. Demolition work on the site began on December 29, 2008, with plans to redevelop the site into a tourist attraction with hotels and beach facilities.

By 2010, all of the UFO houses were demolished, and the site was in the process of being converted to a commercial seaside resort and waterpark.

In popular culture
The houses are referred to in the title of a track on the German pianist Hauschka's 2014 LP Abandoned City.

The site features in one of the sequences of the action film White Phantom.

See also
Futuro house
Wanli District, New Taipei, an area known for similar architecture

References

External links

Photo set on Flickr
Another photo set on Flickr
Videos of the pod houses
Photo gallery at File Magazine
UFO Houses: The "Ruins of the Future"

1978 establishments in Taiwan
2010 disestablishments in Taiwan
Demolished buildings and structures in Taiwan
Buildings and structures demolished in 2010
Ghost towns in Asia
Reportedly haunted locations
History of New Taipei